The General Tire 200 is a 126-mile (200 km) ARCA Menards Series West race held annually at Sonoma Raceway.

Past winners

2008, 2013–2015, 2019, 2021: Race extended due to an overtime finish

See also 
 Toyota/Save Mart 350

References

External links
 

 
ARCA Menards Series West